Stefan Chen Yi-fan (born March 27, 1997), known professionally as ØZI, is a Taiwanese American singer-songwriter and rapper. ØZI is noted for integrating the genres of contemporary urban hip-hop, R&B, and Mandopop.

Early life and education 
ØZI was born Stefan Chen Yi-fan on March 27, 1997, in Los Angeles, California to Chen Wen-bin, a photographer, and Irene Yeh, a singer, and raised in Taipei, Taiwan and the United States. He began taking piano lessons at the age of 4, and learned to play the guitar at the age of 10. ØZI began rapping in high school. He attended the Berklee College of Music for a semester before leaving Boston altogether to pursue a career in music.

Musical career 

ØZI debuted in 2018 with ØZI: The Album, blending the genres of urban hip-hop and R&B. He was nominated for 6 awards at the 30th Golden Melody Awards, and won Best New Artist for his 2018 debut album. He released his second album, PEDESTAL in 2021.

Discography

EPs 

 "And Then I Turned ØZI" (2018)

Singles 

 "Diamond" (2018)
 "If Only" (2019)
 "Who's Next" (2019)
 "MISSIONARY 傳教士" (2019)
 "LAVA!" (2020)
 "FREE FALL" (2020)
 "SLIDE" (2021)
 "0.03" (2021)

Albums 

 ØZI: The Album (2018)
 PEDESTAL 基石 (2021)
 ADICA (2023)

References

External links 

 

Living people
21st-century Taiwanese singers
American people of Taiwanese descent
1997 births
Taiwanese male singers
American expatriates in Taiwan
Musicians from Los Angeles
21st-century American male singers
21st-century American singers